Hazel Grove and Bramhall was a civil parish and urban district in north east Cheshire, England from 1900 to 1974.

It was created in 1900 covering, from Stockport Rural District, the former area of the civil parishes of:

Bosden
Bramhall
Norbury
Offerton
Torkington

In 1939 the former area of the Woodford civil parish was gained.

The district was abolished in 1974, under the Local Government Act 1972, and its former area was transferred to Greater Manchester to be combined with that of other districts to form the present-day Metropolitan Borough of Stockport.

References

Districts of England abolished by the Local Government Act 1972
Local government in the Metropolitan Borough of Stockport
History of Cheshire
History of the Metropolitan Borough of Stockport
Urban districts of England